John Grover "Nig" Perrine (January 14, 1885 – August 13, 1948) was an American professional baseball infielder.

Perrine started his professional baseball career in 1902, at the age of 17. In 1906, he batted .308 in the American Association (AA) and was purchased by the Washington Senators of the American League. However, Perrine was sent back down to the AA after batting .171 in 44 games. He played in the minor leagues until 1915. Perrine was one of several baseball players in the first half of the 20th century to be nicknamed "Nig".

External links

1885 births
1948 deaths
Baseball players from Wisconsin
Major League Baseball second basemen
Washington Senators (1901–1960) players
People from Clinton, Rock County, Wisconsin
Minor league baseball managers
Springfield Reds players
Springfield Midgets players
Des Moines Underwriters players
Kansas City Blues (baseball) players
Minneapolis Millers (baseball) players
Louisville Colonels (minor league) players
St. Paul Saints (AA) players
Omaha Rourkes players
Oklahoma City Indians players
Butte Miners players
Missoula (minor league baseball) players
Seattle Giants players
El Paso Mackmen players